The Ten Mile House is a historic house at 6915 Stagecoach Road in the Mabelvale neighborhood of Little Rock, Arkansas.  It is a -story brick building, with a gabled roof and four end chimneys, each pair joined by a high wall extending above the gable ridge.  It was built sometime between 1822 and 1835 along what was then known as the Old Southwest Trail, which extended from Ste. Genevieve, Missouri to Texas.  Its design is credited to Gideon Shryock, who designed the state house of the Arkansas Territory.

The house was listed on the National Register of Historic Places in 1970.

On the grounds stands the Confederate Last Stand Monument.

See also
National Register of Historic Places listings in Little Rock, Arkansas

References

Houses on the National Register of Historic Places in Arkansas
Georgian architecture in Arkansas
Houses completed in 1822
Houses in Little Rock, Arkansas
1822 establishments in Arkansas Territory